The genus Colletes (plasterer bees) is a large group of ground-nesting bees of the family Colletidae. They occur primarily in the Northern Hemisphere. They tend to be solitary, but sometimes nest close together in aggregations. Species in the genus build cells in underground nests that are lined with a cellophane-like plastic secretion, a true polyester, earning them the nickname polyester bees.

 there were about 469 described species, and an estimated total around 700. They occur throughout the world except in Antarctica, Australia, Madagascar, and Southeast Asia. There are about 60 species in Europe and about 100 in North America north of Mexico.

Species

 Colletes abeillei
 Colletes aberrans
 Colletes abessinicus
 Colletes abnormis
 Colletes acutiformis
 Colletes acutus
 Colletes aestivalis
 Colletes aethiops
 Colletes albescens
 Colletes albicinctus
 Colletes albohirtus
 Colletes albomaculatus
 Colletes alfkeni
 Colletes alfredjohni
 Colletes algarobiae
 Colletes alicularis
 Colletes alini
 Colletes alocochila
 Colletes americanus
 Colletes anceps
 Colletes anchusae
 Colletes andrewsi
 Colletes angelicus
 Colletes ankarae
 Colletes annae
 Colletes annapurnensis
 Colletes annejohnae
 Colletes annulicornis
 Colletes antecessus
 Colletes antiguensis
 Colletes arabicus
 Colletes araucariae
 Colletes arenarius
 Colletes aridus
 Colletes arizonensis
 Colletes armeniacus
 Colletes arsenjevi
 Colletes arztbergi
 Colletes asiaticus
 Colletes askhabadensis
 Colletes atacamensis
 Colletes atlassus
 Colletes atripes
 Colletes aureocinctus
 Colletes azteka
 Colletes azureus
 Colletes babai
 Colletes banksi
 Colletes beamerorum
 Colletes bernadettae
 Colletes bhutanicus
 Colletes bicolor
 Colletes bidentulus
 Colletes birkmanni
 Colletes bischoffi
 Colletes biskrensis
 Colletes bokkeveldi
 Colletes bombiformis
 Colletes bradleyi
 Colletes brethesi
 Colletes brevicornis
 Colletes brevigena
 Colletes brevinodis
 Colletes brimleyi
 Colletes brumalis
 Colletes bruneri
 Colletes brunneitarsis
 Colletes bryanti
 Colletes bulbotibialis
 Colletes bumeliae
 Colletes bytinskii
 Colletes californicus
 Colletes canescens
 Colletes capensis
 Colletes capitatus
 Colletes cardiurus
 Colletes carinatus
 Colletes cariniger
 Colletes caskanus
 Colletes caspicus
 Colletes cercidii
 Colletes chalybaeus
 Colletes chamaesarachae
 Colletes chengtehensis
 Colletes ciliatoides
 Colletes ciliatus
 Colletes cinctellus
 Colletes cinerascens
 Colletes claripes
 Colletes clarus
 Colletes clematidis
 Colletes clypearis
 Colletes clypeatus
 Colletes clypeonitens
 Colletes cognatus
 Colletes collaris
 Colletes comatus
 Colletes comberi
 Colletes compactus
 Colletes conradti
 Colletes consors
 Colletes constrictus
 Colletes coriandri
 Colletes costaricensis
 Colletes covilleae
 Colletes cretaceus
 Colletes creticus
 Colletes cunicularius
 Colletes cyanescens
 Colletes cyaneus
 Colletes cyanonitidus
 Colletes cyprius
 Colletes daleae
 Colletes daourus
 Colletes daviesanus
 Colletes delicatus
 Colletes delodontus
 Colletes dentiventris
 Colletes denudatus
 Colletes deserticola
 Colletes desertorum
 Colletes dilatatus
 Colletes dimidiatus
 Colletes dinizi
 Colletes diodontus
 Colletes distinctus
 Colletes dorni
 Colletes dorsalis
 Colletes dubitatus
 Colletes dudgeonii
 Colletes durbanensis
 Colletes dusmeti
 Colletes eardleyi
 Colletes eatoni
 Colletes ebmeri
 Colletes edentulus
 Colletes elegans
 Colletes emaceatus
 Colletes eous
 Colletes esakii
 Colletes escalerai
 Colletes eulophi
 Colletes eupogonites
 Colletes everaertae
 Colletes extensicornis
 Colletes fasciatus
 Colletes fascicularis
 Colletes faurei
 Colletes flaminii
 Colletes flavicornis
 Colletes floralis
 Colletes fodiens
 Colletes formosus
 Colletes foveolaris
Colletes francesae
 Colletes fraterculus
 Colletes friesei
 Colletes frontalis
 Colletes fulgidus
 Colletes fulvicornis
 Colletes fulvipes
 Colletes furfuraceus
 Colletes fuscicornis
 Colletes fusconotus
 Colletes gallicus
 Colletes gandhi
 Colletes genalis
 Colletes gessi
 Colletes gigas
 Colletes gilensis
 Colletes gilvus
 Colletes glaber
 Colletes glycyrrhizae
 Colletes gorillarum
 Colletes graeffei
 Colletes granpiedrensis
 Colletes grisellus
 Colletes griseus
 Colletes guadalajarensis
 Colletes guichardi
 Colletes gussakowskii
 Colletes gypsicolens
 Colletes hakkari
 Colletes halophilus
 Colletes harreri
 Colletes haubrugei
 Colletes hederae
 Colletes hedini
 Colletes hethiticus
 Colletes hicaco
 Colletes hiekejuniori
 Colletes hiekeseniori
 Colletes himalayensis
 Colletes hirtibasis
 Colletes howardi
 Colletes hyalinus
 Colletes hylaeiformis
 Colletes idoneus
 Colletes impunctatus
 Colletes inaequalis
 Colletes inconspicuus
 Colletes indicus
 Colletes inexpectatus
 Colletes infracognitus
 Colletes inornatus
 Colletes integer
 Colletes intermixtus
 Colletes intricatus
 Colletes inuncantipedis
 Colletes iranicus
 Colletes issykkuli
 Colletes isthmicus
 Colletes jankowskyi
 Colletes jejunus
 Colletes joergenseni
 Colletes judaicus
 Colletes kansensis
 Colletes karooensis
 Colletes kaszabi
 Colletes katharinae
 Colletes kerri
 Colletes kincaidii
 Colletes knersvlaktei
 Colletes kozlovi
 Colletes kudonis
 Colletes lacunatus
 Colletes laevifrons
 Colletes laevigena
 Colletes langeanus
 Colletes larreae
 Colletes latefasciatus
 Colletes laticaudus
 Colletes laticeps
 Colletes laticinctus
 Colletes latipes
 Colletes latitarsis
 Colletes lebedewi
 Colletes ligatus
 Colletes lineatus
 Colletes linsleyi
 Colletes longiceps
 Colletes longifacies
 Colletes louisae
 Colletes lucasi
 Colletes lucens
 Colletes lutzi
 Colletes luzhouensis
 Colletes lycii
 Colletes macconnelli
 Colletes mackieae
 Colletes maidli
 Colletes malleatus
 Colletes malmus
 Colletes mandibularis
 Colletes marginatus
 Colletes marleyi
 Colletes maroccanus
 Colletes mastochila
 Colletes merceti
 Colletes meridionalis
 Colletes metzi
 Colletes mexicanus
 Colletes meyeri
 Colletes michaelis
 Colletes micheneri
 Colletes michenerianus
 Colletes microdontoides
 Colletes microdontus
 Colletes mimincus
 Colletes minutissimus
 Colletes minutus
 Colletes missionum
 Colletes mitchelli
 Colletes mixtus
 Colletes mlokossewiczi
 Colletes moctezumensis
 Colletes montacuti
 Colletes montefragus
 Colletes morawitzi
 Colletes moricei
 Colletes motaguensis
 Colletes mourei
 Colletes murinus
 Colletes musculus
 Colletes nanaeformis
 Colletes nanellus
 Colletes nanus
 Colletes nasutus
 Colletes nautlanus
 Colletes neoqueenensis
 Colletes nieuwoudtvillei
 Colletes niger
 Colletes nigricans
 Colletes nigrifrons
 Colletes nigritulus
 Colletes nitescens
 Colletes nitidicollis
 Colletes niveatus
 Colletes noskiewiczi
 Colletes nudus
 Colletes obscurus
 Colletes ochraceus
 Colletes omanus
 Colletes opacicollis
 Colletes opacus
 Colletes ornatus
 Colletes ottomanus
 Colletes pallescens
 Colletes pallipes
 Colletes panamensis
 Colletes paniscus
 Colletes parafodiens
 Colletes paratibeticus
 Colletes patagonicus
 Colletes patellatus
 Colletes pauljohni
 Colletes penulatus
 Colletes perezi
 Colletes perforator
 Colletes perileucus
 Colletes perplexus
 Colletes persicus
 Colletes peruvicus
 Colletes petalostemonis
 Colletes petropolitanus
 Colletes phaceliae
 Colletes phenax
 Colletes pinnatus
 Colletes platycnema
 Colletes plebeius
 Colletes plumulosus
 Colletes pollinarius
 Colletes popovi
 Colletes productus
 Colletes prosopidis
 Colletes pseudocinerascens
 Colletes pseudojejunus
 Colletes pseudolaevigena
 Colletes pulchellus
 Colletes pumilus
 Colletes punctatus
 Colletes punctipennis
 Colletes quadrigenis
 Colletes radoszkowskii
 Colletes ravulus
 Colletes recurvatus
 Colletes reginae
 Colletes reinigi
 Colletes restingensis
 Colletes reticulatus
 Colletes rhodaspis
 Colletes robertsonii
 Colletes roborovskyi
 Colletes rohweri
 Colletes rothschildi
 Colletes rozeni
 Colletes rubellus
 Colletes rubicola
 Colletes rubripes
 Colletes rubrovittatus
 Colletes rudis
 Colletes ruficollis
 Colletes rufipes
 Colletes rufitarsis
 Colletes rufocinctus
 Colletes rufosignatus
 Colletes rufotibialis
 Colletes rugicollis
 Colletes rutilans
 Colletes salicicola
 Colletes salsolae
 Colletes sanctus
 Colletes saritensis
 Colletes schmidi
 Colletes schrottkyi
 Colletes schultzei
 Colletes schwarzi
 Colletes scopiventer
 Colletes seitzi
 Colletes sellatus
 Colletes seminitens
 Colletes seminitidus
 Colletes senilis
 Colletes sichuanensis
 Colletes sidemii
 Colletes sierrensis
 Colletes similis
 Colletes simulans
 Colletes simus
 Colletes skinneri
 Colletes skorikowi
 Colletes slevini
 Colletes sodalis
 Colletes solidaginis
 Colletes solitarius
 Colletes somereni
 Colletes sordescens
 Colletes sororcula
 Colletes speculiferus
 Colletes sphaeralceae
 Colletes spilopterus
 Colletes squamosus
 Colletes squamulosus
 Colletes stachi
 Colletes standfussi
 Colletes steinbachi
 Colletes stellatus
 Colletes stepheni
 Colletes striginasis
 Colletes subdilatatus
 Colletes submarginatus
 Colletes subnitens
 Colletes succinctus
 Colletes sulcatus
 Colletes susannae
 Colletes swenki
 Colletes tadschikus
 Colletes taiwanensis
 Colletes tardus
 Colletes tectiventris
 Colletes testaceipes
 Colletes texanus
 Colletes thoracicus
 Colletes thysanellae
 Colletes tibeticus
 Colletes timberlakei
 Colletes tinctulus
 Colletes tingoensis
 Colletes titusensis
 Colletes tomentosus
 Colletes transitorius
 Colletes trigonatus
 Colletes tuberculatus
 Colletes tuberculiger
 Colletes tulbaghensis
 Colletes turgiventris
 Colletes ulrikae
 Colletes uralensis
 Colletes utilis
 Colletes vachali
 Colletes wacki
 Colletes wahisi
 Colletes wahrmani
 Colletes validus
 Colletes vandykei
 Colletes warnckei
 Colletes watmoughi
 Colletes weiski
 Colletes westghats
 Colletes wickhami
 Colletes willistoni
 Colletes wilmattae
 Colletes virgatus
 Colletes wolfi
 Colletes wollmanni
 Colletes volsellatus
 Colletes wootoni
 Colletes xerophilus
 Colletes xuechengensis
 Colletes yemensis
 Colletes zuluensis
 Colletes zygophyllum

References

External links
Clark, P. Polyester bees: Born in a plastic bag. Washington Post March 15, 2011.
Colletes Identification Guide (female). discoverlife.org
Colletes Identification Guide (male). discoverlife.org
List of Species. discoverlife.org
Worldwide Species Map. discoverlife.org

Further reading
Kuhlmann, M. (1999). Colletes wolfi spec. nova from Italy, and lectotype designation for Palaearctic bees of the genus Colletes Latr., with notes on new homonymies and synonymies (Hymenoptera: Apidae: Colletinae). Linzer biologische Beiträge 31(1), 71–81.

Colletidae
Bee genera
Taxa named by Pierre André Latreille